Fair Play is a census-designated place located in Oconee County in the U.S. state of South Carolina. A small portion of the CDP extends into Anderson County. As of the 2010 census, the population of Fair Play was 687.

According to tradition, the name stems from an incident in which a bystander implored two brawling pioneers to "play fair".

Geography
Fair Play is located in the southern corner of Oconee County, which occupies the northwestern corner of South Carolina. The CDP extends from the town center south to Lake Hartwell, a large reservoir on the South Carolina–Georgia line. Interstate 85 passes through the CDP, with access via exits 2 and 4.

Demographics

References

Census-designated places in Oconee County, South Carolina
Census-designated places in South Carolina
Census-designated places in Anderson County, South Carolina